Helgerød is a residential- and statistical area (grunnkrets) in Sandefjord municipality, Norway. Helgerød was originally the name of a farm. The name derives from either Helgaruð, from the male name Helgi, or Helguruð, from the female name Helga.

The statistical area Helgerød, which also can include the peripheral parts of the village as well as the surrounding countryside, has a population of 206.

Helgerød is located north of Solløkka. It is considered a part of the urban settlement Sandefjord, which covers the greater Sandefjord city area and stretches towards Stokke and into peripheral parts of Larvik municipality. The urban settlement Sandefjord has a population of 39,849, of which 39,144 people live within Sandefjord.

A sports hall known as Helgerødhallen was established by Helgerød elementary school in 1986. A nearby park was constructed in 2007 and includes a BMX bike trail, ball pond, and skatepark. Two handball fields were built here in 2008.

References

Villages in Vestfold og Telemark